The 2003 World Netball Championships were the eleventh edition of the INF Netball World Cup, a quadrennial premier event in international netball. It was held in Kingston, Jamaica from 10 to 20 July. After 100 matches, New Zealand's Silver Ferns defeated Australia to take the title after its last title 16 years previously. The host country, Jamaica, finished third.

Preliminary games

The competition started with two days of two rounds of knockout games between the 16 unseeded nations for four spots in the championship stage of the competition. The losing 12 teams were placed in the consolation round.

Round One

Round Two

Consolation round

Group A

Group B

Placement Matches

Championship Round

The four top teams in each group qualified for the quarter-finals.

Group A

Group B

Placement Matches

Last Eight

Final rankings

Medallists

References

External links
 2003 World Championships, Jamaica from ABC Sport
 2003 Internationals, from Netball New Zealand

2003
International netball competitions hosted by Jamaica
2003 in netball
2003 in Jamaican sport
Sport in Kingston, Jamaica
July 2003 sports events in North America
21st century in Kingston, Jamaica